Jacqueline Leonard is a British actress. She is known for playing Sarah Preston in the ITV drama Peak Practice from 1993 to 1996, Lorraine Wicks in the BBC soap opera EastEnders from 1996 to 1997, Caroline Powers in the BBC medical drama Doctors from 2000 to 2001, Lydia Murdoch in the Scottish soap opera River City from 2007 to 2010, 2017 to 2019 and in 2022 and as Linda Hancock in the  ITV  soap opera Coronation Street in 2015 and 2022.

Early life
Leonard was born in Blackpool, Lancashire, England. She grew up near Bathgate and Falkirk. She was a pupil at Greenlands High School in Blackpool. Leonard trained at the London Academy of Music and Dramatic Art and was the winner of the Michael Warre Award for Best Actress in 1988.

Career
Leonard has been appearing on British television since the early 1990s. She has had roles in May to December in 1992, A Time to Dance in 1992, Inspector Morse in 1993 and Peak Practice 1993 to 1996, where she played Sarah Preston for four series.  Following this she was cast as Lorraine Wicks in the BBC soap opera EastEnders, a role she played from 1996 to 1997. She took a year off work when she left EastEnders to move from London to Lancashire and care for her sick mother.

Leonard subsequently appeared in television series including Doctors where she played one of the original characters Dr. Caroline Powers from 2000 to 2001, Nice Guy Eddie (2002), Holby City (2003), The Bill (2004), The Courtroom (2004), Goldplated (2006) and Hollyoaks (2007), Holby City (2010). In 2007, Leonard joined the cast of Scottish soap opera River City playing Lydia Murdoch. She quit the role in 2010. In 2017 Leonard reprised the role of Lydia Murdoch, she then quit the role again in 2019 when her character was accidentally killed by her husband Lenny. Although her character was killed off, Leonard continued to appear in the show several times as a ghost only visible to her widower Lenny. Leonard's final appearance was on 30 September 2019. Leonard reprised the role of Lydia Murdoch again in  April 2022 after it was confirmed Lydia didn't actually die in the shooting accident. Leonard appeared on screen again from Monday 11th April 2022.

Her film credits include Chaplin (1992), ID (1995), There's Only One Jimmy Grimble (1999) and The Wicker Tree (2011). On stage she has appeared in Look Back in Anger, The Taming of the Shrew,A Midsummer Night's Dream, A Clockwork Orange, Wuthering Heights and Behind the Green Curtain.

In 2011, Leonard auditioned and was shortlisted for the role of Stella Price in Coronation Street but lost out to former EastEnders actress  Michelle Collins.

In 2014, it was announced that she was joining the cast as Linda Hancock, the ex-wife of established character Owen Armstrong and mother of Katie Armstrong and Izzy Armstrong. She made her first appearance in February 2015.

Filmography

References

External links 
 
 
 
 

Alumni of the London Academy of Music and Dramatic Art
English television actresses
English film actresses
English stage actresses
English actresses
Actresses from Lancashire
English soap opera actresses
Living people
Date of birth missing (living people)
People from Blackpool
Year of birth missing (living people)